Power Magazine is an automobile magazine published in Solna, Sweden.

History and profile
Power Magazine was founded in 1976. The magazine is part of Egmont group. It covers automobile-related articles with a special reference to the American motorcycle culture and racing cars.

References

External links
 Official website

1976 establishments in Sweden
Automobile magazines
Swedish-language magazines
Magazines published in Stockholm
Magazines established in 1976